Krekorian is a surname. Notable people with the surname include:

Jim Krekorian (born 1952), American bridge player
Paul Krekorian (born 1960), American politician